Alexander Fisher (fl. 1584), of Gray's Inn, London, was an English politician.

He was a Member (MP) of the Parliament of England for Clitheroe in 1584.

References

Year of birth missing
Year of death missing
Politicians from London
Members of Gray's Inn
English MPs 1584–1585